Agrahari  is a Hindu Bania community.

People 

Agrahari is also a surname. Notable people with the surname include:

 Birendra Agrahari
 Amrita Agrahari MP
 Chandrama Devi Agrahari
 Brijesh Kumar Gupta MP
 Sitaram Agrahari
 Alok Agrahari Kapilvastu

Other 
 Rama Agrahari Girls College